Bienvenido Figueroa DeLeon (born February 7, 1964) is a Dominican former professional baseball player.

Career
Figueroa spent 1986 through 1991 in the St. Louis Cardinals minor league affiliates before making his major league debut on May 17, 1992. His last MLB appearance was on October 4, 1992, and spent 1993 and 1994 in the minor leagues with the Cardinals and Montreal Expos organizations. In 1995 after being released by the Texas Rangers organization, Figueroa joined the Uni-President Lions of the Chinese Professional Baseball League and won the Taiwan Series. Figueroa split the 1996 season between the Colorado Rockies and Baltimore Orioles organizations and the Diablos Rojos del Mexico of the Mexican League.

He later managed in the minor leagues with the Bluefield Orioles, Delmarva Shorebirds, Frederick Keys, Bowie Baysox, and the Connecticut Defenders.

Personal life
Figueroa's son, Cole, played in MLB and is currently in the Tampa Bay Rays front office.

References

External links

1964 births
Living people
Arkansas Travelers players
Colorado Springs Sky Sox players
Dominican Republic expatriate baseball players in Canada
Dominican Republic expatriate baseball players in the United States
Erie Cardinals players
Florida State Seminoles baseball players
Harrisburg Senators players
Dominican Republic people of African descent
Louisville Redbirds players
Major League Baseball players from the Dominican Republic
Major League Baseball shortstops
Minor league baseball managers
Ottawa Lynx players
Springfield Cardinals players
St. Louis Cardinals players
Rochester Red Wings players
Uni-President Lions players
Dominican Republic expatriate baseball players in Taiwan